Frederick Montye Morson (October 22, 1851March 15, 1944) was a Canadian judge. 

Frederick Montye Morson was born on October 22, 1851, in Chambly, Quebec, to Georgina M. (Kuper) Morson and Frederick Morson. He attended a grammar school in Niagara-on-the-Lake, Ontario; Trinity College, Toronto, where he graduated with a BA in classics in 1871; and Osgoode Hall Law School. He articled at Blake, Kerr & Cassels, was called to the bar of Ontario in 1877, and practised in Hamilton, Ontario, and Toronto before he was appointed to the bench.

Morson was a judge of the county court of York, also called the division court of York, from 1892 to 1931. According to Morson, he decided over 200,000 cases.

Morson died on March 15, 1944. He was a fan of horse racing.

References 

1851 births
1944 deaths
19th-century Canadian judges
20th-century Canadian judges
19th-century Canadian lawyers
Osgoode Hall Law School alumni
People from Chambly, Quebec
Trinity College (Canada) alumni